Hermann Pernsteiner (born 7 August 1990) is an Austrian professional road racing cyclist, who currently rides for the UCI WorldTeam . In August 2018, he was named in the startlist for the 2018 Vuelta a España. In October 2020, he was named in the startlist for the 2020 Giro d'Italia. He finished 30th in the road race at the 2020 Summer Olympics.

Major results
2016
 6th Overall Tour of Austria
1st  Austrian rider classification
2017
 1st  Overall Tour d'Azerbaïdjan
 6th Overall Tour of Slovenia
 10th Overall Istrian Spring Trophy
2018
 1st Gran Premio di Lugano
 2nd Overall Tour of Austria
 2nd Overall Tour of Japan
2020
 10th Overall Giro d'Italia
 10th Overall Tour Down Under
2022
 4th Japan Cup

Grand Tour general classification results timeline

References

External links

1990 births
Living people
Austrian male cyclists
People from Oberwart
Sportspeople from Burgenland
Olympic cyclists of Austria
Cyclists at the 2020 Summer Olympics
Austrian mountain bikers
21st-century Austrian people